Paulo Flôrencio (born 26 June 1918, date of death unknown) was a Brazilian footballer. He played in one match for the Brazil national football team in 1942. He was also part of Brazil's squad for the 1942 South American Championship.

References

External links
 

1918 births
Year of death missing
Brazilian footballers
Brazil international footballers
Place of birth missing
Association football forwards
Associação Portuguesa de Desportos players
Cruzeiro Esporte Clube players
Brazilian expatriate footballers
Expatriate footballers in Venezuela